John Daniel Butcher (born March 8, 1957) is a former Major League Baseball pitcher who played for seven seasons. He played for the Texas Rangers from 1980 to 1983, the Minnesota Twins from 1984 to 1986, and the Cleveland Indians in 1986.

External links

1957 births
Living people
Baseball players from California
Major League Baseball pitchers
Cleveland Indians players
Texas Rangers players
Minnesota Twins players
Sportspeople from Glendale, California
Alaska Goldpanners of Fairbanks players
Asheville Tourists players
Charleston Charlies players
Denver Bears players
Gulf Coast Rangers players
Tulsa Drillers players
Wichita Aeros players
Yavapai Roughriders baseball players